John Thomas Bradley (September 20, 1893 - March 18, 1969) was a Major League Baseball catcher who played for one season. He played for the Cleveland Indians from June 18 to July 31, 1916 and had no hits in 3 at-bats.

External links

1893 births
1969 deaths
Cleveland Indians players
Illinois Fighting Illini baseball players
Major League Baseball catchers
Portland Beavers players
Vancouver Beavers players
Portland Pippins players
Oakland Oaks (baseball) players